Southcentral Foundation (SCF) is an Alaska Native health care organization established by Cook Inlet Region, Inc. (CIRI) in 1982 to improve the health and social conditions of Alaska Native and American Indian people, enhance culture, and empower individuals and families to take charge of their lives. Alaska Native and American Indian people own, manage, direct, design, and drive our Southcentral Foundation. The current President and CEO is April Kyle, MBA. A wide range of medical services and human services are provided to Alaska Native and American Indian people living in the Municipality of Anchorage and Matanuska-Susitna Borough.

In 1998, SCF assumed ownership and management of the primary care program of the Alaska Native Medical Center in Anchorage, Alaska, United States, and in January 1999, began jointly managing and operating ANMC, along with the Alaska Native Tribal Health Consortium.  With this transition, Alaska became the first state in the nation to have all of its health facilities for Native Americans managed by Native organizations.

SCF's Nuka System of Care, established in the late 1990s in south central Alaska, serves a population of around 65,000 people.  It combines integrated health and social care services with a broader approach to improving family and community wellbeing across the population - for example, through initiatives using education, training and community engagement to tackle domestic violence, abuse and neglect. SCF's Nuka System of Care has achieved reductions in hospital activity, high performance in the US healthcare effectiveness data and high levels of user satisfaction.

References

External links 
 

Alaska Native culture in Anchorage
Alaska Native organizations
Healthcare in Alaska
Organizations based in Anchorage, Alaska
Organizations established in 1982
1982 establishments in Alaska